The Defence Abuse Response Taskforce (DART) was an Australian body established to help people who claimed to have suffered physical or sexual abuse, harassment or bullying in the Australian Defence Force before 11 April 2011. The Taskforce worked from 26 November 2012 until 30 June 2016. It considered 2,439 complaints and found 1,751 to be within its scope and plausible. The Taskforce was headed by Len Roberts-Smith, assisted by Robert Cornall, Susan Halliday and Rudi Lammers, with Robyn Kruk acting as Reparation Payments Assessor.

References

Defunct Commonwealth Government agencies of Australia